Michael Jordan: An American Hero is an American television film that aired on Fox Family Channel on April 18, 1999. It stars Michael Jace as Michael Jordan.

Plot 
The opening titles of the film shows footage of Jordan preparing for a game with the Chicago Bulls. The film is mostly based on the life of Michael Jordan from his childhood until when he grew up to be an NBA player. It also highlights the moments of when Michael played baseball as both a child and his short-lived minor league baseball career as well as his knack of golfing. The film ends with Michael in an empty arena after a game and he shoots a basket while flashbacks of his childhood when his father taught him how to shoot appear. The closing titles mentions that Jordan retired from basketball for good on January 13, 1999. However, in real life, he made a short-lived comeback in 2001 when he played for the Washington Wizards until 2003 when he retired for a third and final time.

Cast 
 Michael Jace as Michael Jordan 
 Dari Gerard Smith as Michael Jordan (age 6)
 Cordereau Dye as Michael Jordan (age 12)
 Thomas Hobson as Michael Jordan (teenager)
 Jascha Washington as Larry Jordan (age 7)
 Desi Arnez Hines II as Larry Jordan (teenager)
 Debbie Allen as Deloris Jordan
 Ernie Hudson as James R. Jordan Sr.
 D. Elliott Woods as Leroy
 Brenan T. Baird as Phil Jackson
 Christopher Jacobs as Buzz Peterson
 Robin Givens as Juanita Jordan
 Mark Mathias as Abel Broxton
 John Valdetero as Coach Herring
 Randy J. Goodwin as Ahmad Rashad
 Ed Zajac as Ron Schueler
 Kristine Kelly as Reporter

External links

References

1999 films
American basketball films
American biographical films
Cultural depictions of Michael Jordan
ABC Family original films
Films directed by Alan Metzger
1990s American films